The Collingwood Formation is a geologic formation in Michigan. It preserves fossils dating back to the Ordovician period.

See also

 List of fossiliferous stratigraphic units in Michigan

References
 

Ordovician System of North America
Ordovician Michigan
Oil shale in Canada
Oil shale in the United States
Oil shale formations
Oil-bearing shales in Canada
Oil-bearing shales in the United States
Ordovician southern paleotropical deposits
Middle Ordovician Series